Otura may refer to:
 Otura, Asturias, Spain
 Villa de Otura, Granada, Spain